
CHAR No.4 was a restaurant and whiskey bar located in the New York City neighborhood of Cobble Hill, Brooklyn, specializing in southern cuisine and noted for its large selection of Bourbon whiskey.

CHAR opened in 2008 and closed in summer 2015.

Whiskey bar
CHAR No.4 housed an extensive selection of American Whiskey in New York City, including several hundred bottles of mainly Bourbon whiskey. Whiskey is sold in either one or two ounce portions, with some of the rarest whiskeys listed at $100 an ounce.  In 2010, it was ranked the number one whiskey bar in New York City by Citysearch.

Menu
Char No.4's menu was centered on smoked meat, changing every few months to reflect the seasons.  The most notable dish on the menu was the Pork Belly BLT, which was named "Best Sandwich" by New York Magazine's Adam Platt in 2009.  However, the item was taken off the menu in early 2010.

See also
 List of Southern restaurants

References

Restaurants in Brooklyn
Restaurants established in 2008
Cobble Hill, Brooklyn
Southern restaurants